Miss Europe 1971 was the 34th edition of the Miss Europe pageant and the 23rd edition under the Mondial Events Organization. It was held at the Palais des sports d'El Menzah in Tunis, Tunisia on 19 September 1971. Filiz Vural of Turkey, was crowned Miss Europe 1971 by outgoing titleholder Noelia Alfonso Cabrera of Spain.

Results

Placements

Special awards

Contestants 

 - Ursula Illich
 - Martine Yasmine de Hert
 - Dorrit Weinrich
 - Pamela Wood
 - Pirjo Laitila
 - Myriam Stocco
 - Lilian Atterer
 - Georgia "Gogo" Atzoletaki
 - Laura Mulder-Smid
 - Margret Linda Björnsson Gunnarsdóttir
 - Mary Aurray
 - Roberta Mauro
 - Mariette Werckx
 - Tessa Marthese Galea
 - Ruby Reitan
 - Ana Paula de Almeida
 - Josefina "Fina" Román Gutierrez de Chiclana
 - Lena Arvidsson
 - Anita Andrini
 - Filiz Vural
 - Magda (Majda) Jazbec

Notes

Withdrawals

Returns

"Comité Officiel et International Miss Europe" Competition

From 1951 to 2002 there was a rival Miss Europe competition organized by the "Comité Officiel et International Miss Europe". This was founded in 1950 by Jean Raibaut in Paris, the headquarters later moved to Marseille. The winners wore different titles like Miss Europe, Miss Europa or Miss Europe International.

This year contest took place in Florence, Italy on 2 September 1971. The number of delegates is unknown. At the end, Laurence Vallée of France was crowned as Miss Europa 1971. She succeeded predecessor Marie Korner (Körner) of Germany.

Placements

Contestants

 - Laurence Vallée

References

External links 
 

Miss Europe
1971 beauty pageants
1971 in Tunisia
1971 in Italy